Power of Dreams is the sixth studio album by Japanese J-pop singer and songwriter Maki Ohguro. It was released on 6 August 1997 under B-Gram Records.

Album consist of the five previously released singles, such as Aah, Atsuku Nare, Unbalance, Genki Dashite and Sora.

Atsuku Nare is one of her biggest hits, which single sold more than million copies. It also received new album mix under title Album version. It has total of 14 tracks which makes her the longest studio album in her whole career.

The single Aishitemasu didn't make it to this album, instead it was released in her the first compilation album Back Beats #1. Kaze ni nare was originally supposed to release as a single, however it was postponed due to unknown reasons and end up releasing in this album as the part of the album tracks.

The album reached No. 1 in its first week on the Oricon chart. The album sold 1,755,000 copies. It's her most successful studio album in her entire music career history. It got rewarded with Gold disc by Recording Industry Association of Japan.

Track listing

In media
Mistral: opening theme to TV Asahi news broadcast ANN NEWS
Unbalance: theme song for TV Asahi program X File'''s 2nd season
Atsuku Nare: broadcast theme song for NHK's Atlanta 1996Aah: theme song for TV Asahi television drama Aji Ichi Monme 2nd season
Sora: opening theme for Anime television series Chūka Ichiban!Genki dashite: commercial song for Asahi Soft Drinks's Mitsuya Cider''

References

Being Inc. albums
Japanese-language albums
1997 albums
Maki Ohguro albums